Brendan J. Hokowhitu is a New Zealand academic who is of Māori, Ngāti Pūkenga descent and as of 2019 is a full professor at the University of Waikato.

Academic career
After a 2001 PhD titled  'Te mana Māori : Te tātari i ngā kōrero parau'  at the University of Otago, Hokowhitu moved to the University of Alberta in Edmonton and then to the University of Waikato, rising to full professor.

In 2019, Hokowhitu was elected a Fellow of the Royal Society of New Zealand.

Selected works 
 Hokowhitu, Brendan. "Tackling Maori masculinity: A colonial genealogy of savagery and sport." The Contemporary Pacific 16, no. 2 (2004): 259–284.
 Jackson, Steven J., and Brendan Hokowhitu. "Sport, tribes, and technology: The New Zealand All Blacks haka and the politics of identity." Journal of Sport and Social Issues 26, no. 2 (2002): 125–139.
 Hokowhitu, Brendan. "'Physical beings': Stereotypes, sport and the'physical education'of New Zealand Māori." Culture, Sport, Society 6, no. 2-3 (2003): 192–218.

References

External links
  
 

Living people
Year of birth missing (living people)
New Zealand Māori academics
University of Otago alumni
Academic staff of the University of Waikato
Academic staff of the University of Alberta
Academic staff of the University of Otago
Fellows of the Royal Society of New Zealand
Ngāti Pūkenga people
University of Victoria alumni